Achillea alpina, commonly known as alpine yarrow, Chinese yarrow or Siberian yarrow, is an Asian and North American species of plant in the sunflower family. It is native to Siberia, the Russian Far East, China, Mongolia, Korea, Japan, Nepal, Canada (including Yukon and Northwest Territories), the northern United States (Alaska, northern North Dakota, northern Minnesota).

Description
Achillea alpina is a perennial herb up to 80 cm (2 feet) tall. Flowers are white to pale violet, with both ray florets and disc florets. The foliage is simply pinnatifid with narrow closely set segments.

Subspecies and varieties
 Achillea alpina subsp. camtschatica (Heimerl) Kitam.
 Achillea alpina var. discoidea (Regel) Kitam.
 Achillea alpina subsp. japonica (Heimerl) Kitam.
 Achillea alpina subsp. pulchra (Koidz.) Kitam.
 Achillea alpina subsp. subcartilaginea (Heimerl) Kitam.

This species is found growing in thickets and along shorelines in northwestern North America and it reaches its most southernly distribution in northern Minnesota near the Canadian border where isolated populations are found growing in a peat meadows at the margins of aspen trees, open woods, woodland edges, stream banks, and roadsides. In Minnesota it was listed as a threatened species in 1996.

References

External links
Alaskan Wildflowers
Bioglobe
Czech Botany, Achillea alpina L. – Siberian Yarrow, Chinese Yarrow in English with photos

alpina
Flora of temperate Asia
Flora of Subarctic America
Plants described in 1753
Taxa named by Carl Linnaeus
Flora of Western Canada
Flora of Eastern Canada
Flora of North Dakota
Flora of Minnesota
Flora without expected TNC conservation status